R&B Divas may refer to:
R&B Divas: Atlanta, which was originally named R&B Divas
R&B Divas: Los Angeles, a spin-off
R&B Divas (album), an album led by American recording artist Faith Evans, produced in conjunction with the television series.